The Ranks and insignia of the Japan Self-Defense Forces are the military insignia used by the Japan Self-Defense Forces.

History

Following the end of World War II in Asia, after the surrender of Japan, the Imperial Japanese Army and Imperial Japanese Navy were dissolved by the Supreme Commander for the Allied Powers during the occupation of Japan. The symbols below represent the ranks of the Japan Self-Defence Forces: the Japan Ground Self-Defence Force, the Japan Air Self-Defence Force, and the Japan Maritime Self-Defence Force, which replaced the imperial military in 1954. The 1938–1945 Japanese military and naval ranks were phased out after World War II. The Self-Defence Force breaks away from the Sino-centric tradition of non-branch-specified ranks; each JSDF rank with respect to each service carries a distinct Japanese title, although equivalent titles in different branches are still similar, differing only in the use of the morphemes riku (ground) for the army ranks, kai (maritime) for the naval ranks, and kū (air) for the aviation ranks.

The pentagramic stars on the insignia represent cherry blossoms. Because Japanese soldiers take an oath to die to protect the lives and wealth of Japanese citizens, they have been compared to delicate cherry blossoms that break easily.

Ground Self-Defense Force

Commissioned officer ranks
The rank insignia of commissioned officers.

Other ranks
The rank insignia of non-commissioned officers and enlisted personnel.

Maritime Self-Defense Force

Commissioned officer ranks
The rank insignia of commissioned officers.

Other ranks
The rank insignia of non-commissioned officers and enlisted personnel.

Air Self-Defense Force

Commissioned officer ranks
The rank insignia of commissioned officers.

Other ranks
The rank insignia of non-commissioned officers and enlisted personnel.

See also 
 Ranks of the Imperial Japanese Army
 Ranks of the Imperial Japanese Navy

References

External links 

 

Japan Self-Defense Forces
Military ranks of Japan